The 2005 edition of the Tour of Britain stage race was run as a UCI 2.1 category in six stages starting in Glasgow on 30 August and finishing in London on 4 September:

Stages

Prelude
29 August: Glasgow
Mass participation ride followed by Glasgow criterium stage part of the Elite Circuit series.

Stage 1
30 August: Glasgow to Castle Douglas,

Stage 2
31 August: Carlisle to Blackpool,

Stage 3
1 September: Leeds to Sheffield,

Stage 4
2 September: Buxton to Nottingham,

Stage 5
3 September: Birmingham ITT,

Final Stage (6)
4 September: London – London,

References

2005 in British sport
Britain
2005
2005 sports events in London
August 2005 sports events in the United Kingdom
September 2005 sports events in the United Kingdom